Cope Middle School is the name of two schools in the United States:

Cope Middle School (Louisiana), in Bossier City
Cope Middle School, in Redlands Unified School District, Redlands, California